Pseudomonas pohangensis is a Gram-negative, non-fluorescent, non-sporulating, non-motile, rod-shaped bacterium isolated from seashore sand on Homi cape, near Pohang city, Korea. The type strain is KACC 11517.

References

External links
Type strain of Pseudomonas pohangensis at BacDive -  the Bacterial Diversity Metadatabase

Pseudomonadales
Bacteria described in 2006